A heronry, sometimes called a heron rookery, is a breeding ground for herons.

Notable heronries
Although their breeding territories are often on more protected small islands in lakes or retention ponds, herons breed in heronries (or also called rookeries, especially since other birds join them like spoonbills, storks, and cormorants). Some of the notable heronries are:

Asia 
 Kaggaladu Heronry is in Karnataka state of India. This heronry, in the Tumkur district of Karnataka, was first made known to the outside world in 1999 by members of the Tumkur-based NGO Wildlife Aware Nature Club.

Europe 

 Cleeve Heronry, in a woodland near the village of Cleeve in North Somerset, UK.
 Hilgay Heronry is in Norfolk. It is situated in a small copse on the edge of The Fens in the UK. An average of c. 40 pairs of grey heron nests each year at this site, in ash (Fraxinus excelsior) and European larch (Larix decidua) trees.

North America 
The Florida Everglades in south Florida, of the United States.  Thousands of birds, including herons, egrets, spoonbills, and storks, nest in mangroves (genus Rhizophora).

See also
Bird colony

References

External links

Herons
Reproductive ecology